Walker Township is one of eighteen townships in Platte County, Nebraska, United States. The population was 205 at the 2020 census. A 2021 estimate placed the township's population at 202.

History
Walker Township was established in 1871 by John Walker and others. In 1884, Joseph Alfred Borg settled on the land and purchased 160 acres.

See also
County government in Nebraska

References

External links
City-Data.com

Townships in Platte County, Nebraska
Townships in Nebraska